Sir Francis Anthony Meere (24 July 189515 April 1985) was a senior Australian public servant. He was Comptroller-General of Customs between 1952 and 1960, heading first the Department of Trade and Customs and then the Department of Customs and Excise.

Life and career
Meere was born in Daylesford, Victoria on 24 July 1895. He was educated at the Christian Brothers College, St Kilda.

Meere joined the Commonwealth Public Service in 1913 in Victoria in the Department of Trade and Customs. Between 1947 and 1952, Meeres was assistant Comptroller-General of Customs in the Department.  He was promoted to Comptroller-General of Customs in 1952.

Meere retired from his Customs position in July 1960, and soon after was appointed a director of Pope Industries Limited, a manufacturing business.

Meere's first wife, Lady Helena Agnes Meere, died in December 1961.

Meere died on 15 April 1985, and a Requiem Mass was held for him at St Christopher's Cathedral in Manuka, Canberra.

Awards
Meere was appointed an Officer of the Order of the British Empire for his public service in June 1952. He was promoted to a Commander of the Order in 1955. 

In June 1960, Meere was made a Knight Bachelor.

References

1895 births
1985 deaths
Australian Commanders of the Order of the British Empire
Australian Knights Bachelor
20th-century Australian public servants
People from Daylesford, Victoria
People educated at St Mary's College, Melbourne